San Francisco Art Institute (SFAI) was a private college of contemporary art in San Francisco, California. Founded in 1871, SFAI was one of the oldest art schools in the United States and the oldest west of the Mississippi River. Approximately 220 undergraduates and 112 graduate students were enrolled in 2021. The institution was accredited by the Western Association of Schools and Colleges (WASC) and the National Association of Schools of Art and Design (NASAD), and was a member of the Association of Independent Colleges of Art and Design (AICAD). The school closed permanently in July 2022.

History

The San Francisco Art Institute was established in 1871 with the formation of the San Francisco Art Association—a small but influential group of artists, writers, and community leaders, most notably, led by Virgil Macey Williams and first president Juan B. Wandesforde, with B.P. Avery, Edward Bosqui, Thomas Hill, and S.W. Shaw, who came together to promote regional art and artists, and to establish a school and museum to further and preserve what they saw as a new and distinct artistic tradition which had developed in the relative cultural isolation and unique landscape of the American West.

By 1874 the SFAA had 700 regular members and 100 life members and had raised sufficient funds and the necessary momentum to launch an art school, which was named the California School of Design (CSD). Painter Virgil Macy Williams, who had spent nearly ten years studying with master painters in Italy and had taught at Harvard College before coming to San Francisco, became the school's first director and painting instructor—positions he held until his sudden death in 1886. During Williams' tenure, the CSD developed a national reputation and amassed a significant collection of early California and western fine art as the foundation collected for a planned museum.

In 1893, Edward Searles donated the Hopkins Mansion, one of the most palatial and elaborate Victorian mansions ever built, to the University of California in trust for the SFAA for "instruction in and illustration of the fine arts, music and literature." Named the Mark Hopkins Institute of Art, it became San Francisco's first fine art and cultural center and housed both the CSD's campus and SFAA's art collection. Through this new affiliation, students of the University of California were able to enroll in classes at the CSD.

In 1906 the devastating fire following the San Francisco earthquake destroyed the Mark Hopkins Institute of Art building, and the CSD and SFAA facilities, records and art collection. At the time, the replacement value of the building and its contents was estimated at $2.573 million. However, the combined amount of numerous insurance policies yielded less than $100,000 for rebuilding. Nevertheless, within a year, the SFAA built a new but comparatively modest campus in the same location, and adopted the name San Francisco Institute of Art.

In 1916, the SFAA merged with the San Francisco Society of Artists and assumed directorship of the San Francisco Museum of Art at the Palace of Fine Arts, which was established to host the 1915 World's Fair, Panama–Pacific International Exposition. In addition, the school was renamed the California School of Fine Arts (CSFA) to better reflect its mission to promote, develop and preserve regional art and culture. In 1926 the school moved to 800 Chestnut Street, which remains the school's main campus . In 1930 Mexican muralist Diego Rivera was hired to paint The Making of a Fresco Showing the Building of a City, which is located in the student-directed art gallery.

During its first 60 years, influential artists associated with the school included Eadweard Muybridge, photographer and pioneer of motion graphics; Maynard Dixon, painter of San Francisco's labor movement and of the landscape of the West; Henry Kiyama, whose Four Immigrants Manga was the first graphic novel published in the U.S.; Sargent Claude Johnson, one of the first African-American artists from California to achieve a national reputation; Louise Dahl-Wolfe, an innovative photographer whose work for Harper’s Bazaar in the 1930s defined a new American style of "environmental" fashion photography; Gutzon Borglum, the creator of the large-scale public sculpture known as Mt. Rushmore; Rudolf Hess, German Expressionist painter and art critic, and numerous others.

After World War II ended (1945) the school became a nucleus for Abstract Expressionism, with faculty including Clyfford Still, Ad Reinhardt, Mark Rothko, David Park, Elmer Bischoff, and Clay Spohn. Although painting and sculpture remained the dominant mediums for many years, photography had also been among the course offerings. In 1946 Ansel Adams and Minor White established the first fine-art photography department, with Imogen Cunningham, Edward Weston, and Dorothea Lange among its instructors. In 1947 distinguished filmmaker Sydney Peterson began the first film courses at CSFA. In this spirit of advancement, in 1949 CSFA Director Douglas MacAgy organized an international conference, The Western Roundtable on Modern Art, which included Marcel Duchamp, Frank Lloyd Wright, and Gregory Bateson. The roundtable aimed to expose “hidden assumptions” and to frame new questions about art.

By the early 1950s San Francisco's North Beach had become the West Coast center of the Beat Movement, and music, poetry, and discourse were an intrinsic part of artists' lives. Collage artist Jess Collins renounced a career as a plutonium developer and enrolled at SFAI as a painting student. In 1953 he and his partner, poet Robert Duncan, along with painter Harry Jacobus, started the King Ubu Gallery, an important alternative space for art, poetry, and music.
A distinctly Californian modern art soon emerged that fused abstraction, figuration, narrative, and jazz. SFAI faculty David Park, Elmer Bischoff, James Weeks, James Kelly, Frank Lobdell, and Richard Diebenkorn were now the leaders of the Bay Area Figurative Movement, informed by their experience of seeing local museum exhibitions of work by Edvard Munch, Max Beckmann, Edgar Degas, and Henri Toulouse-Lautrec. Students at the school, including David Simpson, William T. Wiley, Robert Hudson, William Allan, Joan Brown, Manuel Neri, Carlos Villa, and Wally Hedrick, continued the investigation of new ideas and new materials, many becoming the core of the Funk art movement.

Renamed San Francisco Art Institute in 1961, SFAI rejected the distinction between fine and applied arts. SFAI stood at the forefront of recognizing an expanded vocabulary of art-making that hybridized many practices including performance, conceptual art, new media, graphic arts, typography, and political and social documentary.
Students in the early to mid-1960s included artists Ronald Davis, Robert Graham, Forrest Myers, Leo Valledor, Michael Heizer, Ronnie Landfield, Peter Reginato, Gary Stephan, and John Duff and in the late 1960s Annie Leibovitz, who would soon begin photographing for Rolling Stone magazine; Paul McCarthy, well known for his performance and sculpture works; and Charles Bigelow, who would be among the first typographers to design fonts for computers. Alumni Ruth-Marion Baruch and Pirkle Jones documented the early days of the Black Panther Party in northern California.

In 1969, a new addition to the building by Paffard Keatinge-Clay added  of studio space, a large theater/lecture hall, an outdoor amphitheater, galleries, and a cafe.

Installation art, video, music, and social activism continued to inform much of the work of faculty and students in the 1970s and 1980s. The faculty during this period included George Kuchar, Gunvor Nelson, Howard Fried, Paul Kos, Angela Davis, Kathy Acker, Robert Colescott, and many other influential artists and writers. Among the students were a number of performance artists and musicians, including Karen Finley, whose performances challenged notions of femininity and political power, and Prairie Prince and Michael Cotten, who presented their first performance as the Tubes in the SFAI lecture hall, and became pioneers in the field of music video. The school became a hub for the Punk music scene, with bands such as the Mutants, the Avengers, and Romeo Void all started by SFAI students. Technology also became part of art practice: faculty Sharon Grace's Send/Receive project used satellite communications to create an interactive transcontinental performance, while Survival Research Laboratories, founded by student Mark Pauline, began staging large-scale outdoor performances of ritualized interactions among machines, robots, and pyrotechnics.

Since the 1990s the studio and classroom have become increasingly connected to the world via public art and community actions. As students at SFAI, Barry McGee, Aaron Noble, and Rigo 23, among others, were part of the movement known as the Mission School, taking their graffiti-inspired art to the streets and walls of the city. Faculty and students have created site-specific projects in locations from the San Francisco waterfront (Ann Chamberlain and Walter Hood's monument to the Abraham Lincoln Brigade) to the U.S. Consulate in Tijuana, Mexico (a sculpture by artist Pedro Reyes and SFAI students for the U.S. Department of State's Art in Embassies program). Organizations like Artists' Television Access (ATA) and Root Division, founded by alumni, and SFAI's City Studio program engage and educate local communities and cultivate a vital artistic ecosystem.
The school's history was recognized in 2016, when its campus was listed on the National Register of Historic Places.

Closure
Due to financial mismanagement, declining enrollment, high real estate costs, and a reliance on income from campus property rentals, which was exacerbated by the COVID-19 pandemic in the United States, the school announced on March 23, 2020, that it would stop accepting new students for the following fall semester. The institute marked its 149th birthday on Thursday, March 26, 2020, shortly after failed merger talks. They briefly announced that the fall semester was canceled before reversing their decision and allowing for online and offline classes through the next school year.

In July 2020, after securing $4 million in donations, the board and administration announced an agreement had been reached to retain all tenured faculty for the coming academic year, resulting in the continuation of courses for the following academic year and the reinstatement of the degree program for those within a year of graduation.

In February 2022 the University of San Francisco and SFAI announced that they are studying an acquisition of SFAI by USF, however USF backed out of the deal in July. SFAI ceased its degree programs but will remain as "a nonprofit organization to protect its name, archives, and legacy." On  July 16, 2022, the school closed permanently.

Academics
SFAI offered Bachelor of Arts (BA), Bachelor of Fine Arts (BFA), Master of Arts (MA), and Master of Fine Arts (MFA) degrees. SFAI also offered Low-Residency MFAs and Post-Baccalaureate certificates in Studio Art.

Photography
Founded by Ansel Adams in 1945, the Photography Department became the first program of its kind dedicated to exploring photography as a fine-art medium. Adams designed the school's darkrooms and attracted photographers for the original faculty, including Dorothea Lange, Imogen Cunningham, Minor White, and Morley Baer, who became Head of the Department after White's departure in 1953.

Painting
Throughout the SFAI Painting Department's history, it had been home to celebrated artists such as Clyfford Still, Mark Rothko, Richard Diebenkorn, Jay DeFeo, Fred Martin, Elmer Bischoff, David Park, David Simpson, Frank Lobdell, Roy De Forest, Joan Brown, Ronald Davis, William T. Wiley, Toba Khedoori, Barry McGee, Inez Storer and Kehinde Wiley among others and was central to movements such as Abstract Expressionism, Bay Area Figuration, Color Field, California Funk, and the Mission School.

New Genres
Howard Fried founded the performance and video department (now New Genres) at the San Francisco Art Institute. In the late 1970s, a long-lost collection of Eadweard Muybridge photographs was found and an auction of the materials financed the creation of the department — and the purchase of two Portopak cameras. (More than a century before, the English artist had presented the first ever public showing of moving pictures on campus and apparently left something behind.)

Music
Among the many artist musicians who studied at SFAI are Jerry Garcia, guitarist in Grateful Dead; Dave Getz, drummer for Big Brother and the Holding Company and Country Joe and the Fish; Prairie Prince of The Tubes; Debora Iyall of Romeo Void; Freddy (aka Fritz) of the Mutants; Penelope Houston of the Avengers, Courtney Love, actress and rock musician;
Jonathan Holland of Tussle; Devendra Banhart.

Housing
In Summer 2010, SFAI moved its housing program to two locations in Nob Hill: Sutter Hall at 717 Sutter Street, and Abby Hall at 630 Geary Street. In Spring 2020, the housing program was dissolved due to financial exigency.

Exhibitions and public programs
Students were given direct access to exhibitions, lectures, symposia, films, and other unique interdisciplinary events. An integral part of campus life, such events connected students to the larger community of artists, art, and contemporary ideas. The Walter and McBean Galleries (on the 800 Chestnut Street campus) house exhibitions, workshops, and other alternative and experimental avenues for presenting work by international contemporary artists. Students also had the opportunity to display their work in a number of spots on SFAI's two campuses, including the Diego Rivera Gallery.

Adaline Kent Award
Former board member (1947–1957), Adaline Kent was a sculptor and alumni of the school. Upon her death in 1957, she bequeathed $10,000 for the establishment of an annual award for a promising California Artist. Each year since 1957 the prize was awarded by the San Francisco Art Institute Artists' Committee. Winners included Ron Nagle (1978), Wally Hedrick (1985), Mildred Howard (1991), Clare Rojas (2004), and as the final award, Scott Williams (2005).

Notable former faculty

 Kathy Acker
 Ansel Adams, landscape photographer, founded the photography department in 1945
 Gertrude Partington Albright, painting and etching (1917–46)
 Roy Ascott, Dean 1975-1978
 Craig Baldwin, filmmaker
 Blixa Bargeld, musician (2008)
 Elmer Bischoff, painting
 Charles Boone, composer
 James Broughton, filmmaking 1969-1982
 Rea Irvin
 Stan Brakhage, filmmaker
 Joan Brown, painting
 John Collier, visual anthropologist
 Christopher Coppola, film director/producer
 Linda Connor, large-format photographer
 Dewey Crumpler, muralist and painter
 Imogen Cunningham, portrait photographer
 Angela Davis (1976)
 Jay DeFeo
 James Budd Dixon, painting
 Richard Diebenkorn, painting 
 Trisha Donnelly
 Okwui Enwezor
 Howard Fried, installation, performance, video artist, founded the New Genres department
 Sonia Gechtoff, painting
 María Elena González
 Rene Green
 Doug Hall
 Julius Hatofsky, painting
 Wally Hedrick
 Hou Hanru
 Robert H. Hudson, sculpture
 Pirkle Jones, photographer
 Paul Kos, conceptual artist
 George Kuchar (1972–2011), filmmaker
 Tony Labat, installation artist 
 Dorothea Lange, photographer
 Pedro Joseph de Lemos, decorative design, director, 1911-1917 
 Leo Lentelli, sculptor
 Janis Crystal Lipzin, filmmaker, interdisciplinary artist
 Frank Lobdell, painting
 Brenda Louie
 Lydia Lunch
 Eric Spencer Macky, painter, former Dean from 1919 until 1935.
 Arthur Frank Mathews, muralist, painter
 Tom Marioni
 Fred Martin, beat-era, post-war painter and writer and Professor Emeritus.
 Alicia McCarthy, painter 
 Jane McGonigal, game designer and author
 Frederick Meyer, founder of the California College of the Arts (1907)
 Jose Moya del Pino, painter
 Bruce Nauman,  Process & Conceptual Art.
 Manuel Neri, sculpture
 Charlemagne Palestine
 David Park, painting
 Sidney Peterson, film director, initiated first film courses at SFAI (1947)
 Jim Pomeroy, new media
 Brett Reichman, painter 
 Mark Rothko, painter (1947, 1949)
 Hassel Smith, painting
 Ralph Stackpole, sculptor, painter
 Clyfford Still, painter (1946-1950)
 Inez Storer, painter (1981–99)
 Larry Sultan, photographer
 Taravat Talepasand
 Leo Valledor, painting
 Carlos Villa, painter
 James Weeks, painting
 Henry Wessel, Jr. (1972-2014), one of the New Topographics photographers.
 Minor White, photographer
 Griff Williams, painting, printmaking
 Al Wong (born 1938), experimental filmmaker, mixed media installation artist, taught at SFAI from 1975 until 2003.
 Caveh Zahedi, filmmaker

See also
 Index of San Francisco Art Institute Alumni
 Diego Rivera Gallery
 List of San Francisco Designated Landmarks

References

External links
 

 
Art schools in San Francisco
Film schools in California
Universities and colleges in San Francisco
Russian Hill, San Francisco
San Francisco Designated Landmarks
Schools accredited by the Western Association of Schools and Colleges
Educational institutions established in 1871
1871 establishments in California
School buildings on the National Register of Historic Places in California
National Register of Historic Places in San Francisco